The 2019 Dutch TT was the eighth round of the 2019 MotoGP season. It was held at the TT Circuit Assen in Assen on 30 June 2019.

Classification

MotoGP

 Jorge Lorenzo suffered a neck injury in a crash during practice and withdrew from the event.

Moto2

 Somkiat Chantra suffered a broken left wrist in a crash during Sunday warm-up session and withdrew from the event.
 Philipp Öttl withdrew from the event due to effects from a crash during previous round at Catalunya.
 Dimas Ekky Pratama suffered a concussion in a crash during Friday practice and was declared unfit to compete.

Moto3

Championship standings after the race

MotoGP

Moto2

Moto3

Notes

References

External links

Dutch
TT
Dutch TT
Dutch TT